Louise de la Béraudière, known as La belle Rouhet (1530-1611) was a French court official. She served as Fille d'honneur to queen Catherine de Medici, and dame d'atour to the queen of France, Louise of Lorraine, from 1575 until 1590. She was known for her affair with king Antoine of Navarre.

Life
She was the daughter of René de Béraudière and Madeleine du Fou. She became maid-of-honour to queen Catherine de Medici. She had an affair with king Antoine of Navarre, and it was believed that it was she who convinced Antoine to return to Catholicism on the mission of Catherine de Medici.
She became the mother of Charles III de Bourbon (1554-1610) by Antoine. She left her employment as maid-of-honour and married.

She is also known for her love affairs with Michel de Montaigne and Robert de Combault. She was rumored to have had affairs with both king Charles IX of France and king Henry III of France, but this is unconfirmed.

In 1575, she was appointed Dame d'atour to the new queen. As such it was her task to manage the queen's wardrobe and supervise her 10 chamber maids, but she had also been appointed because of her sense of fashion, and it was her task to advise the queen in how to dress, a task which was important for the fashion-interested king, which she is said to have performed with success.

References 

  Michel Simonin, Charles IX, Paris, Fayard, 1995, p. 102.

Sources

1530 births
1611 deaths
16th-century French people
French ladies-in-waiting
Mistresses of French royalty
Court of Henry III of France